Bishops Lydeard is a village and civil parish located in Somerset, England,  north-west of Taunton in the district of Somerset West and Taunton. The civil parish encompasses the hamlets of East Lydeard, Terhill, and East Bagborough, and had a population of 2,839 persons as recorded in the 2011 census; this figure, however, includes the village (and now separate parish) of Cotford St Luke.

The village has been bypassed, since 1967, by the A358 road; the West Somerset Railway also runs through the area. The hamlet of East Lydeard is less than a mile to the east of the village; East Bagborough is a mile to the north, and Terhill another mile or so further on while west of the village is Sandhill Park, an eighteenth-century country house.

History
The name of the village probably relates to Gisa, Bishop of Wells, who was its principal tenant and one of the major episcopal landowners in Somerset at the time of the Domesday Book in 1086. Lydeard is a compound of two Saxon personal names Lide (Lloyd), a derivative of the Brythonic word meaning grey (llwyd), and Geard, the latter remaining as a local name, "Yarde".  As well as a personal name, geard means 'a fence, enclosure, courtyard or dwelling', again of Brythonic origin, as in the modern Welsh word, garth, or personal names, Garth or Gareth. The grey enclosure or ridge seems a plausible alternative derivation.

The parish of Bishops Lydeard was part of the Kilmersdon Hundred.

Cotford St Luke is a new village, built in the southern part of Bishops Lydeard parish, which became a separate civil parish in 2011, splitting off from Bishops Lydeard.

Governance
The parish council has responsibility for local issues, including setting an annual precept (local rate) to cover the council's operating costs and producing annual accounts for public scrutiny. The parish council evaluates local planning applications and works with the local police, district council officers, and neighbourhood watch groups on matters of crime, security, and traffic. The parish council's role also includes initiating projects for the maintenance and repair of parish facilities, as well as consulting with the district council on the maintenance, repair, and improvement of highways, drainage, footpaths, public transport, and street cleaning. Conservation matters (including trees and listed buildings) and some environmental issues are also the responsibility of the council.

The village falls within the non-metropolitan district of Somerset West and Taunton, which was established on 1 April 2019. It was previously in the district of Taunton Deane, which was formed on 1 April 1974 under the Local Government Act 1972, and part of Taunton Rural District before that. The district council is responsible for local planning and building control, local roads, council housing and environmental health, in addition to markets and fairs, refuse collection and recycling, cemeteries and crematoria, leisure services, parks and tourism.

Somerset County Council is responsible for running other services such as education, social services, libraries, main roads (primary routes), public transport, as well as trading standards, waste disposal and strategic planning.

There is an electoral ward with the same name as the parish. However the most populous area of the ward is at Cotford St. Luke; it also extends to Halse and northwards to West Bagborough. The ward has a population of 6,323 as at the 2011 Census.

It is also part of the Taunton Deane county constituency represented in the House of Commons of the Parliament. It elects one Member of Parliament (MP) by the first past the post system of election, and was part of the South West England constituency of the European Parliament prior to Britain leaving the European Union in January 2020.

Landmarks

Lydeard House was built in the mid 18th century. It is a Grade II* listed building.

Watermill

There were originally two flour mills in Bishops Lydeard. Higher Mill has been demolished. The Bishops Lydeard Mill and Rural Life Museum is housed in a building which dates from the 18th century, and was extended in the early 19th century with the addition of a millhouse. It has an overshot waterwheel and has been designated as a Grade II listed building. Since 2000 the building has been renovated with the renovations opened by the town Mayor in 2003. The water wheel weighs over two tonnes and is driven by water from Back Stream which originates in the Brendon Hills. The museum focuses on traditional trades and crafts including a wheelwright's shop, cooper's shop, saddler's shop, blacksmith's shop and a Victorian kitchen.

Sandhill Park

Sandhill Park was built as a country house around 1720. It was built by John Periam, the Member of Parliament for Minehead, as Hill House and lived in by the Lethbridge family from 1767 to 1913. During World War I it was used as a prisoner of war camp for German and Austro-Hungarian officers. In 1919 it was converted by Somerset County Council into a home for handicapped children. It was requisitioned by the military in August 1940 and became the 41st General Military Hospital, providing accommodation in tents and huts. From 1941 the hospital was leased to the American Army as a neurological hospital for over 1,000 patients in 32 new wards, which were completed in 1942. The hospital remained in military use until 1944. The psychiatric hospital reopened under the National Health Service in 1948 and further buildings were constructed. The hospital was sold in 1991 and housing built on part of the site.

The buildings of Sandhill Park were badly damaged in a fire on 22 November 2011, the east wing being gutted and extensive damage caused to the main house.  The west wing and orangery survived.

Religious sites
The church of St Mary dates from the 14th and 15th centuries and in 1860–62 was extended by one bay and a vestry by Edward Jeboult of Taunton. It is a Grade I listed building. The tower has pierced tracery battlements, pinnacles, set back buttresses terminating in pinnacles at the bell-storey, and pinnacles on the buttresses at each stage. Several of the tombs in the churchyard are of historical importance, as are two crosses, one dating from the 14th century, the other being the town's market cross which was moved to the churchyard in the 19th century.

Transport

West Somerset Railway
Bishops Lydeard railway station is a notable station on the heritage West Somerset Railway, as the southern terminus of passenger services.

Bus services
The village is served by scheduled bus services provided by First West of England on the Taunton — Minehead route. These run approximately every half-hour during daytimes Monday to Saturday in both directions, and generally every hour on Sundays.

Other destinations, including Bridgwater and Kingston St Mary are also served, but less frequently.

References

External links

Villages in Taunton Deane
Civil parishes in Somerset